Bi Wenjun (born 21 November 1997)  is a Chinese singer and actor. He is a member of the Chinese boy group NEXT.

Biography
Bi Wenjun participated in the Chinese boy band survival program Idol Producer aired from January 19 to April 6, 2018. He eventually placed 10th in the final episode.

Bi debuted as a member of Yuehua's new boy band NEXT with the song "Wait a Minute" on June 21, 2018.

Bi made his acting debut with a leading role in the youth sports drama Sweet Tai Chi, which aired in 2019. He released his first solo single "Fist With My Heart" for the soundtrack of the drama. The same year he became a cast member of the fashion variety show Lipstick Prince. Forbes China listed Bi under their 30 Under 30 China 2019 list which consisted of 30 influential people under 30 years old who have had a substantial effect in their fields.

In 2020, Bi starred in the historical romance drama In a Class of Her Own alongside Ju Jingyi and Song Weilong. He is set to star in the historical romance drama Ni Chang as the male lead; as well as The Silence of the Monster and Sweet Teeth.

In 2021, Bi starred in a psychological and youth drama, Seizing Dreams, historical drama, Jiu Xiao Han Ye Nuan, and e-sport romance drama, Mo Bai.

Discography

Singles

Soundtrack appearances

Filmography

Television series

Television shows

Awards and nominations

Notes

References 

1997 births
Living people
People from Fushun
Idol Producer contestants
Chinese idols
Male actors from Liaoning
Singers from Liaoning
Chinese male television actors
21st-century Chinese male actors
Shenyang Conservatory of Music alumni
21st-century Chinese male singers